Morten Alexander Hulgaard (born 23 August 1998) is a Danish former cyclist, who competed as a professional from 2017 to 2022.

Major results

2016
 National Junior Road Championships
2nd Road race
3rd Time trial
 2nd Overall Internationale Cottbuser Junioren-Etappenfahrt
 5th Overall Tour de l'Abitibi
2017
 2nd Kernen Omloop Echt-Susteren
 9th Duo Normand
 9th Eschborn–Frankfurt Under-23
2018
 6th Lillehammer GP
 7th Gylne Gutuer
 9th Hafjell GP
2019
 Tour de la Mirabelle
1st  Points classification
1st Stage 1a
 2nd Gylne Gutuer
 6th Time trial, UCI Road World Under-23 Championships
 6th Hafjell GP
2020
 1st Stage 1 (TTT) Giro del Friuli-Venezia Giulia
 4th Time trial, National Under-23 Road Championships
 4th Overall Bałtyk–Karkonosze Tour
1st Young rider classification
 6th Il Piccolo Lombardia
2021
 3rd Overall Tour Poitou-Charentes en Nouvelle-Aquitaine
1st  Young rider classification
 3rd Münsterland Giro
 4th Overall Kreiz Breizh Elites
2022
 5th Time trial, National Road Championships
 8th Time trial, UEC European Road Championships

References

External links

1998 births
Living people
Danish male cyclists